From Out of Nowhere may refer to:

"From Out of Nowhere" (song), a song by Faith No More
From Out of Nowhere (Jeff Lynne's ELO album), an album by Jeff Lynne's ELO
From Out of Nowhere (Tommy Emmanuel album), an album by Tommy Emmanuel
From Out of Nowhere (Power Rangers in Space), an episode of Power Rangers in Space